KQXL-FM (106.5 FM, "Q106.5") is an urban adult contemporary music formatted radio station serving the Baton Rouge, Louisiana, area. The Cumulus Media station operates with an effective radiated power (ERP) of 50 kW and is licensed to New Roads, Louisiana.  Its studios are located downtown and the transmitter tower is located just north of Baton Rouge between the suburbs of Baker and Zachary.

History
KQXL, which signed on as a Mainstream Urban in 1979 and was originally at 106.3 until a power upgrade in 1988, began its evolution into its current format in 1997 after it was paired with former competitor WEMX-FM.

Former on-air staff
Isiah Carey currently works as a reporter for KRIV, channel 26, in Houston, Texas.

Programming
In addition to the R&B and Classic Soul featured as part of the format, KQXL carries two nationally syndicated shows: The Rickey Smiley Morning Show and The D.L Hughley Show.

External links
 Q106.5's website

Radio stations in Louisiana
Urban adult contemporary radio stations in the United States
Cumulus Media radio stations